Patrick Halpin may refer to:

 Patrick G. Halpin, County Executive of Suffolk County, New York
Patrick Halpin (engraver)